Larisa Leonidovna Petrik (born 28 August 1949) is a former Soviet gymnast and Olympic champion.
Petrik competed at the 1966 World Championships where she shared in the team silver medal (gold went to the Czechoslovaks) and earned an individual bronze medal on the beam.
She also competed at the 1968 Summer Olympics in Mexico City, where she received a gold medal in floor exercise (shared with Věra Čáslavská), a gold medal in team combined exercises, and a bronze medal in balance beam. Her gold medal on floor was very controversial because originally, Čáslavská won outright. After the competition was concluded, Petrik's prelims scores were changed to let her tie with Čáslavská, an action which caused Čáslavská to publicly defy the Soviets who had recently invaded her home country.

After marrying the Olympic gymnast Viktor Klimenko she changed her last name to Klimenko. She has two sons: Vladimir and Viktor; Vladimir is a gymnast and Viktor is a ballet dancer.

References

External links

1949 births
Living people
Gymnasts at the 1968 Summer Olympics
Russian female artistic gymnasts
Soviet female artistic gymnasts
Olympic gymnasts of the Soviet Union
Olympic gold medalists for the Soviet Union
Olympic medalists in gymnastics
Medalists at the 1968 Summer Olympics
Medalists at the World Artistic Gymnastics Championships
Olympic bronze medalists for the Soviet Union
Universiade medalists in gymnastics
Universiade gold medalists for the Soviet Union
Medalists at the 1970 Summer Universiade